The men's shot put event at the 2015 European Athletics U23 Championships was held in Tallinn, Estonia, at Kadriorg Stadium on 12 July.

Medalists

Results

Final
12 July

Qualifications
12 July

Participation
According to an unofficial count, 27 athletes from 20 countries participated in the event.

References

Shot put
Shot put at the European Athletics U23 Championships